Platen is a small town in the commune of Préizerdaul, in western Luxembourg. , the town has a population of 507.

Préizerdaul
Towns in Luxembourg